Lykourgos Angelopoulos (1941 – 18 May 2014) was a Greek chanter. He was professor at the School of Byzantine Chant at the Conservatory of Athens, the founder and director of the Greek Byzantine Choir and an Archon Protopsaltes (lead protopsaltes) of the Patriarchate of Constantinople.

Life 
Lykourgos A. Angelopoulos was born in Pyrgos, Peloponnese, on September 21, 1941. He studied Byzantine music at the School of National Music, under the tutelage of the great musician and musicologist, Simon Karas, and Law at the University of Athens. He took a diploma in the Macedonian Odeion of Thessaloniki. .  He was the protopsaltes (first cantor) at the Church of Saint Irene in Athens (first in the Metropolis of Athens). He was the founder and director of the Greek Byzantine Choir and professor of Byzantine Music at the Nikos Skalkotas Conservatory and at the Philippos Nakas Conservatory in Athens. He was the director of the Children's Byzantine Choir of the Archbishopric of Athens since its foundation and the director of the School of Byzantine Music for the Metropolis of Elis and Olena and the Metropolis of Rethymno and Avlopotamou.

Works 

Lykourgos Angelopoulos had published his own editions according to the re-introduction of signs taken from Late Byzantine notation. Simon Karas translated them within the rhythmic context of Neo-Byzantine notation as ornaments. Concerning performance practice, the choir follows Karas' innovations and his interpretation of the Byzantine modes, due to Lykourgos Angelopoulos' use of the "extended" neumatic notation in his own hand-written chant editions. In a contribution to a musicological conference at Delphi (1986), Lykourgos Angelopoulos explained his attitude to the living tradition and to the New Method in general, and editions based on Simon Karas' Method in particular.He died at the age of 73 on 18 May 2014.

International collaboration 

He had collaborated with the Athens Radio Broadcast on programs related to Byzantine Music and had performed contemporary music composed by M. Adamis, D. Terzakis and K. Sfetsas. He was a member of the research team headed by Marcel Pérès in France, which studies the old Western chants and their relationship to the Byzantine ones. He had performed Byzantine, Old Roman, Ambrosian and other traditions of Western plainchant in recordings with the Ensemble Organum in France.

Honours 

In 1994 Lykourgos Angelopoulos was honored by the Ecumenical Patriarch Bartholomew I with the Patriarchal offikion and was named Archon Protopsaltis (First Chanter) of the Holy Archdiocese of Constantinople. He had also been honored by Diodoros, Patriarch of Jerusalem, by the Orthodox Church of Finland and by the Diocese of Patras in Greece.

Influence on the living tradition 

Lykourgos had especially influenced Georgios Konstantinou, who proposed a notation for microtonal shifts (melodic attraction) and notated details, which had previously been part of oral tradition. The advantage of the oral tradition is that only those singers who had been introduced by their masters, followed a certain local tradition. The Balkans and the Orient are still rich of these local traditions. Lykourgos Angelopoulos was well known for his international collaborations, e.g. with Divna Ljubojević, and as a charismatic singer who had a large following. He had faced strong opposition among psaltes who belong to these local traditions.

Works

Essays

Interpretations

Fieldwork

External links

Portraits 

 Programme.

Workshop

Controversies about the Karas School

Notes

References

1941 births
2014 deaths
Performers of Byzantine music
20th-century Greek male singers
People from Pyrgos, Elis
Greek musicologists
Members of the Church of Greece